The Union Peace Dialogue Joint Committee (UPDJC) is the top negotiating committee in Myanmar's ongoing peace process. The committee consists of representatives from the government, ethnic armed groups and political parties whose have incumbent elected parliamentarians. It was formed as a part of prescribed peace process which is outlined in the Nationwide Ceasefire Agreement.

References 

Internal conflict in Myanmar